Alexander Kubalov (1871, Stary Batakoyurt, Terek Oblast – 1937) was an Ossetian writer.

1871 births
1937 deaths
People from Terek Oblast
Ossetian writers
Taras Shevchenko National University of Kyiv alumni